Statistics of Swedish football Division 3 for the 1997 season.

League standings

Norra Norrland 1997

Mellersta Norrland 1997

Södra Norrland 1997

Norra Svealand 1997

Östra Svealand 1997

Västra Svealand 1997

Nordöstra Götaland 1997

Nordvästra Götaland 1997

Mellersta Götaland 1997

Sydöstra Götaland 1997

Sydvästra Götaland 1997

Södra Götaland 1997

Footnotes

References 

Swedish Football Division 3 seasons
4
Sweden
Sweden